Mahdavi Damghani is an Iranian surname. Notable people with the surname include:

 Ahmad Mahdavi Damghani (1926–2022), Iranian scholar and university professor
 Abdolmajid Mahdavi Damghani, Iranian agroecologist 

Persian-language surnames
Compound surnames